The Seventh Gate is a novel by Geraldine Harris published in 1983.

Plot summary
The Seventh Gate is a novel in which the 'Seven Citadels' tetralogy is concluded.

Reception
Dave Langford reviewed The Seventh Gate for White Dwarf #66, and stated that "a double-punch finale which fails to surprise you with the identity of the Saviour our hero's been questing for, but then goes one better - pushing fantasy clichés beyond their limits into a kind of realism. Nifty stuff."

Reviews
Review by Raymond H. Thompson (1984) in Fantasy Review, September 1984
Review by Helen McNabb (1985) in Vector 126

References

1983 novels